Maxim Nikolaevich Galanov (born 13 March 1974) is a Russian former professional ice hockey player. Galanov was drafted 61st overall by the New York Rangers in the 1993 NHL Entry Draft and played in the National Hockey League for the Rangers, Pittsburgh Penguins, Atlanta Thrashers and the Tampa Bay Lightning. In all, Galanov played 122 regular season games in the NHL, scoring 8 goals and 12 assists for 20 points and recording 44 penalty minutes. Before and after his time in the NHL Galanov played for several teams in Russia, retiring in 2013. Internationally Galanov played for Russia at the 2000 World Championship.

Career statistics

Regular season and playoffs

International statistics

External links

1974 births
Atlanta Thrashers players
Augsburger Panther players
Binghamton Rangers players
Detroit Vipers players
Hartford Wolf Pack players
HC Lada Togliatti players
Metallurg Novokuznetsk players
HC Neftekhimik Nizhnekamsk players
Living people
Louisville Panthers players
New York Rangers draft picks
New York Rangers players
Pittsburgh Penguins players
Russian ice hockey defencemen
St. John's Maple Leafs players
Severstal Cherepovets players
Sportspeople from Krasnoyarsk
Tampa Bay Lightning players